Duane Cole (April 1, 1914–February 3, 2004) was an American Aerobatic pilot.

Early life 
Duane earned his private license in 1938, followed by his commercial in 1939 and instructor in 1940.

Cole performed in his first airshow in 1940, followed by training cadets in the Civilian Pilot Training Program throughout World War II.

Career 
Cole performed from 1947 to 1963 as part of the Cole Brothers Airshows along with his brothers Arnold, Lester and Marion Cole, who remained in the business for many years flying a 65 hp clipped wing Taylorcraft BF-50.

Duane left the airshow business in 1963 following the death of his son, Rolly Cole, who was killed during airshow practice over an Illinois farm field practicing for the EAA fly-in held at Rockford, IL, when the engine failed and separated from the fuselage of his 450-HP Stearman biplane. The following year Duane was asked to produce and manage the Reno Air Races, which had been dormant for some years. Duane continued to produce the Reno races at least into the 1970s.

In 1971 Duane and his wife Judy established the Duane and Judy Cole award to individuals that promote sport aviation with the first award given to Paul Poberezny. In 1974 Cole won the Aviation /Spacewriters award for best book "The Flying Coles".

Cole's Taylorcraft resides in the EAA AirVenture Museum.  As the photograph shows, his name was painted on the fuselage upside-down, because he spent more time inverted than upright during his routines.

References 

To A Pilot; memorial to his son Rolly - By Duane Cole 1964
Conquest of Lines and Symmetry by Duane Cole 1971
The Flying Coles - By Duane Cole 1974
Roll Around a Point - By Duane Cole 1976
Happy Flying Safely - By Duane Cole 1977

1914 births
2004 deaths
Aerobatic pilots
Aviators from Illinois